Mouloudia Club d'Oran, an Algerian professional association football club, has gained entry to Confederation of African Football (CAF) competitions on several occasions.

History

CAF competitions

Non-CAF competitions

Statistics

By season
Information correct as of 20 April 2016.
Key

Pld = Played
W = Games won
D = Games drawn
L = Games lost
F = Goals for
A = Goals against
Grp = Group stage

PR = Preliminary round
R1 = First round
R2 = Second round
SR16 = Second round of 16
R16 = Round of 16
QF = Quarter-final
SF = Semi-final

Key to colours and symbols:

By competition

In Africa
:

Non-CAF competitions

Statistics by country
Statistics correct as of game against Kawkab Marrakech on April 20, 2016

CAF competitions

Non-CAF competitions

African competitions goals
Statistics correct as of game against Kawkab Marrakech on April 20, 2016

Hat-tricks

Two goals one match

Non-CAF competitions goals

African and Arab opponents by cities

Notes & references

Notes

References

External links
 Club Achievements and international participations - Officiel website

Africa
Algerian football clubs in international competitions